Death Wish is a 2018 American action thriller film directed by Eli Roth and written by Joe Carnahan. It is a remake of the 1974 film of the same name and a reboot of the Death Wish film series, based on Brian Garfield's 1972 novel. The film stars Bruce Willis as Paul Kersey, a Chicago doctor who sets out to get revenge on the men who attacked his family. Vincent D'Onofrio, Elisabeth Shue, Dean Norris, and Kimberly Elise also star.

A remake of the 1974 film was first announced in 2006, with Sylvester Stallone set to direct and star, before dropping out. Carnahan was announced to write and direct after in 2012, but later dropped out too, although was given sole screenwriting credit despite his script being rewritten numerous times since. Roth joined as director in 2016, with filming taking place in Chicago that same year with director of photography Rogier Stoffers. Mark Goldblatt served as editor in post-production, while the score was composed by Ludwig Göransson.

Death Wish was released in the North America by Metro-Goldwyn-Mayer and internationally by Annapurna International on March 2, 2018, and underperformed at the box office, only grossing $49.6 million worldwide against a $30 million budget. The film received generally negative reviews from critics; many criticizing its depiction of gun violence in comparison to then-recent mass shootings, claiming it as spreading "right-wing" and "pro-gun" messages, with Roth denying said claims.

Plot
Trauma surgeon Paul Kersey lives with his wife, Lucy, and daughter, Jordan, in Chicago. When the family visits a restaurant with Paul's brother Frank, Miguel the valet secretly copies their address after hearing that they plan to stay out. However, Paul is suddenly called to the hospital, and Jordan and Lucy return home just as three armed criminals break in, leading to Lucy being killed and Jordan left in a coma from being severely beaten.

Paul becomes frustrated with the lack of police progress on the case, contemplating purchasing a firearm. When a gang member is brought to the hospital and his gun falls out, Paul secretly takes it and practices shooting. He later uses it to stop a carjacking, injuring his left hand in the process. A captured video of the carjacking goes viral, earning Paul the nickname "Grim Reaper". After treating a boy who was attacked for refusing to sell drugs for a dealer calling himself the "Ice Cream Man", Paul guns him down in broad daylight.

News reports consistently demonstrate divided opinions of support and condemnation of Paul's developing war against violent criminals. After realizing that one of his deceased patients is Miguel, Paul takes his phone, leading him to a liquor store which fences stolen goods. The owner, Ponytail, recognizes Paul and messages another criminal, Fish. Fish sneaks in and accidentally kills Ponytail while trying to shoot Paul. Fish identifies the second member of the group, Joe, before Paul kills him. The cops visit Paul to discuss the case; afterwards, he destroys the phones to cover his tracks. Finding Joe at an auto body shop, he tortures him. Joe divulges that the third robber, Knox, murdered Lucy, before Paul kills him.

Knox calls Paul, arranging to meet in a nightclub bathroom where they exchange fire and wound each other. Paul gets away while Knox goes to the police and gives them a physical description of Paul. Arriving home, Paul is confronted by Frank, who then answers the front door and is questioned by the detectives of his brother's whereabouts. During the intervention, the hospital calls to tell Paul that Jordan has regained consciousness.

A week later, Paul leaves the hospital with Jordan as Knox cases his house for an ambush. Paul glimpses a man running across the lawn and orders Jordan to hide and call the police. After killing Knox's men, Paul is shot and wounded by Knox, but manages to pull out a hidden rifle he purchased earlier and kills him. The police arrive and accept Paul's story after he hints he is done with vigilantism.

Months later, Paul drops off Jordan at New York University. Spotting a man stealing a bag from a bellhop, he calls out and points a finger gun at him.

Cast

 Bruce Willis as Dr. Paul Kersey, a trauma surgeon turned vigilante known as The Grim Reaper
 Vincent D'Onofrio as Frank Kersey, Paul's brother
 Elisabeth Shue as Lucy Kersey, Paul's wife
 Dean Norris as Detective Kevin Raines
 Beau Knapp as Knox
 Kimberly Elise as Detective Leonore Jackson
 Stephanie Janusauskas as Sophie
 Camila Morrone as Jordan Kersey, Paul and Lucy's daughter
 Jack Kesy as Tate "The Fish" Karp
 Ronnie Gene Blevins as Joe
 Len Cariou as Ben, Paul's father-in-law
 Kirby Bliss Blanton as Bethany
 Wendy Crewson as Dr. Jill Klavens
 Mike Epps as Dr. Chris Salgado, Paul's coworker
 Luis Oliva as Miguel

Production

Development
Development on the film began already back in 2006, when Sylvester Stallone announced that he would be directing and starring in a remake of Death Wish (1974). Stallone told Ain't It Cool News, "Instead of the Charles Bronson character being an architect, my version would have him as a very good cop who had incredible success without ever using his gun. So when the attack on his family happens, he's really thrown into a moral dilemma in proceeding to carry out his revenge." He later told the publication that he was no longer involved after "creative differences" and became busy with work on other projects. In a 2009 interview with MTV though, Stallone stated that he was again considering the project. In late January 2012, The Hollywood Reporter confirmed that a remake would be written and directed by Joe Carnahan. The film was originally set to star Liam Neeson and Frank Grillo. Carnahan too left the project in February 2013 due to "creative differences", but received sole writing credit for the completed film. He was replaced as director with Gerardo Naranjo, who was interested in casting Benicio Del Toro in the lead role; this version also never came to fruition.

Casting
After the completed script lay dormant for 3 years, It was brought back up in March 2016, when Metro-Goldwyn-Mayer announced that Aharon Keshales and Navot Papushado would direct the film. Willis was chosen for the role of Paul Kersey, others that were considered for the role were Russell Crowe, Matt Damon, Will Smith, Brad Pitt, Liam Neeson, Kurt Russell, Michael Keaton, Christopher Lambert, Dennis Quaid, Richard Gere, Mel Gibson, Harrison Ford, Don Johnson, Peter Weller, Ron Perlman, Stephen Lang, Michael Biehn, Tommy Lee Jones, Jeff Bridges and Arnold Schwarzenegger. In May, Keshales and Papushado quit the project after MGM declined to allow them to rewrite Joe Carnahan's original script, which had been approved by Willis. In June, Eli Roth signed on to direct, with the script being rewritten by Scott Alexander and Larry Karaszewski. On August 25, 2016, Vincent D'Onofrio was cast alongside Bruce Willis to play Paul Kersey's brother, Breaking Bad actor Dean Norris also joined Willis in the film. On October 7, 2016, Kimberly Elise and Camila Morrone were cast in the film to play Detective Jackson and Jordan Kersey. Later on October 17, 2016, Ronnie Gene Blevins was cast in the film.

Filming
Principal photography began in September 2016 in Chicago, Illinois. Later in October 2016, it began filming in Montreal, Quebec, Canada. During filming, Roth had spent a lot of time with multiple detectives in Chicago to get some important details about police stations correct.

Release
In June 2017, it was announced Annapurna Pictures would distribute the film on behalf of Metro-Goldwyn-Mayer Pictures and release it on November 22, 2017. However, in October 2017, it was announced it was being delayed until March 2, 2018 and that MGM would handle the film's distribution in the United States, with Annapurna Pictures handling its international distribution. It was speculated the delay was due in-part to the mass shooting in Las Vegas several days prior.

Reception

Box office
Death Wish grossed $34 million in the United States and Canada, and $14.5 million in other territories, for a worldwide total of $48.5 million, against a production budget of $30 million.

In the United States and Canada, Death Wish was released alongside Red Sparrow, and was projected to gross $10–20 million from 2,847 theaters in its opening weekend. It made $4.2 million on its first day (including $650,000 from Thursday night previews) and $13 million in its opening weekend, finishing third behind Black Panther ($66.7 million in its third week) and Red Sparrow ($17 million). 55% of its audience was male, while 89% was over the age of 25. It dropped 49% to $6.6 million in its second weekend, finishing at 7th.

Critical response

The film was widely panned by critics. The website's critical consensus reads, "Death Wish is little more than a rote retelling that lacks the grit and conviction of the original—and also suffers from spectacularly bad timing." On Metacritic, the film has a weighted average score of 31 out of 100, based on 32 critics, indicating "generally unfavorable reviews". Audiences polled by CinemaScore gave the film an average grade of "B+" on an A+ to F scale.

The Chicago Sun-Timess Richard Roeper gave the film 2 out of 4 stars, writing, "Even with the social commentary, Death Wish isn't trying to be some intense, gritty, ripped-from-the-headlines docudrama ... A number of gruesome scenes are staged like something out of one of those Final Destination movies, with a bowling ball, a dart, a wrench and other conveniently handy items used as weapons of singular destruction. It's essentially revenge porn." Michael Phillips of the Chicago Tribune gave the film 1 out of 4 stars and said, "For a while, director Roth plays this stuff relatively straight, and Willis periodically reminds us he can act (the grieving Kersey cries a fair bit here). The script contains a reference to AR-15 rifles; by the end, Willis goes full Willis when his adversaries return to the sanctity of the family home."

Many critics noted the timing of the film's release, coming less than three weeks after the Stoneman Douglas High School shooting in Parkland, Florida alongside the positive portrayal of American gun culture. Jeannette Catsoulis of The New York Times called the film "imbecilic", and criticized its jokey tone and "morally unconflicted" approach to its subject matter. Similarly, The Guardians Amy Nicholson criticized the film for "[flatlining] the politics and [saturating] the pathos", and for insulting both sides of the gun control argument.

The Hollywood Reporters John DeFore noted that the film does not attempt to "use genre metaphors to address real national debates", making the original film "look philosophical by comparison", and he also noted the improbable and contrived nature of Kersey's mission. Writing for the Los Angeles Times, Justin Chang called the film "a slick, straightforward revenge thriller as well as a sham provocation, pandering shamelessly to the viewer's bloodlust while trying to pass as self-aware satire". Chang compared the film unfavorably to Death Sentence (2007), citing the lack of consequences that Kersey faces.

Some reviewers stood in defense of the film. Peter Howell of the Toronto Star stated that "Roth and Carnahan do an OK job updating Death Wish", and that the film accurately depicts the "casual way that Americans acquire and use guns". He felt, though, that Liam Neeson would have been a better choice for the lead role. Matthew Rozsa of Salon agreed that the film's release was timed poorly, but argued that "mass shootings have been ubiquitous for so long that I doubt there ever would have been an appropriate release date for a vigilante fantasy. ... It exists everywhere in our culture, from movies and video games to the right-wing talking points that regularly thwart gun control legislation." Rozsa considers Death Wish his guilty pleasure, recommending it as a "success" as well as "a competent popcorn muncher that moves at a brisk pace, is about as engaging as your average Law and Order episode and contains an appropriately glowering (if somewhat bored looking) Bruce Willis." The San Francisco Chronicles Mick Lasalle called it "way better than all the Death Wish sequels" and "easily the second best Death Wish movie ever made, and not a distant second."

Accolades
39th Golden Raspberry Awards (February 23, 2019)
Worst Actor (Bruce Willis) (nominated)
Worst Prequel, Remake, Rip-off or Sequel (nominated)

Notelist

References

External links

 
 Death Wish at MGM Studios
 
  
 

Death Wish (film series)
2018 action thriller films
2018 crime drama films
2018 thriller drama films
2010s vigilante films
American action thriller films
American crime drama films
Remakes of American films
American films about revenge
American thriller drama films
American vigilante films
2010s English-language films
Films about murderers
Films based on American crime novels
Films directed by Eli Roth
Films scored by Ludwig Göransson
Films set in Chicago
Films set in hospitals
Films shot in Chicago
Films shot in Montreal
Films with screenplays by Joe Carnahan
Home invasions in film
Medical-themed films
Political controversies in film
Film controversies
Film controversies in the United States
Metro-Goldwyn-Mayer films
Vertigo Films films
Films produced by Roger Birnbaum
2010s American films
Reboot films